Alpuech (Languedocien: Alpuèg) is a former commune in the Aveyron department in the Occitanie region of southern France. On 1 January 2016, it was merged into the new commune of Argences-en-Aubrac.

The inhabitants of the commune are known as Alpuechois or Alpuechoises

Geography
This commune lies below the south-central portion of the Massif Central on the plateau of the Viadène to the northwest of the plateau of Aubrac.

The commune is long and narrow oriented from north-west to south-east about 50 km south-west of Saint-Flour and 50 km north-west of Marvejols.  Access to the commune is by road D921 which crosses the central waist of the commune from Laguiole in the south-west to Lacalm in the north east.  The D34 road starts from this road on the eastern border of the commune and passes through to the north-west, through the village and continues west to La Terrisse.  There are a number of country roads in the commune but no other villages or hamlets.

The Argence Vive stream forms the western border of the commune and flows westward to join the river Truyère. Its tributary Argence Morte also rises in the commune and flows north where it forms part of the northern border before continuing westwards to the Argence Vive. Apart from the Ruisseau de Fluols in the south-western border these are the only significant waterways in the commune.

Neighbouring communes and villages

History
Alpuech existed in 976 and from the fourteenth century fairs that took place there were famous in the country.

The Castle of Alpuech as well as that of Cantoin, the Barony of Benaven, and Lacalm castle all belonged to the County of Rodez. This gave the benefit to Alpuech of the monastery of Pebrac (Haute Loire) in 1215. The castle was destroyed in 1550. The oldest houses surround the church which is from the 11th century in the Roman style with a Latin cross. In good weather the bell tower has views over the Cantal Mountains. There are traces of Roman roads and also paths from the 16th century on the road to Vitrac and a remarkable "tau cross" from the 12th century north of the village.

Administration
List of Successive Mayors of Alpuech

Mayors from 1935

Population

Sites and monuments
The Church of Saint Martin (11th century) is registered as an historical monument

Notable people linked to the Commune
J.P. Bouyssou, known as the 'Thief of Alpuech' was an outlaw and Royalist who was a "Robin Hood" of the revolutionary era: he took from the rich to give to the poor.

See also
Communes of the Aveyron department

References

External links
Canton of Sainte Geneviève-sur-Argence tourism website 
Alpuech on Géoportail, National Geographic Institute (IGN) website 
Alpuech on the 1750 Cassini Map

Former communes of Aveyron
Populated places disestablished in 2016